Keith Godding (born January 23, 1984, in Ajax, Ontario) is a professional Canadian football wide receiver who is currently a Free Agent. He most recently played for the BC Lions of the Canadian Football League. He was previously signed as an undrafted free agent by the Montreal Alouettes in 2008. He played CIS football for the Bishop's Gaiters.

Godding has also played for the Toronto Argonauts of the Canadian Football League.

External links 
BC Lions bio

1984 births
Living people
BC Lions players
Bishop's Gaiters football players
Canadian football wide receivers
Edmonton Elks players
Montreal Alouettes players
People from Ajax, Ontario
Players of Canadian football from Ontario
Toronto Argonauts players